is a Japanese football player currently playing for Tochigi SC on loan from Matsumoto Yamaga FC.

Club statistics
Updated to 23 February 2018.

References

External links
Profile at V-Varen Nagasaki

1989 births
Living people
Ryutsu Keizai University alumni
Association football people from Gunma Prefecture
Japanese footballers
J1 League players
J2 League players
Thespakusatsu Gunma players
V-Varen Nagasaki players
Sagan Tosu players
Yokohama FC players
Tochigi SC players
Matsumoto Yamaga FC players
Association football defenders